Stoney Creek is a settlement in New Brunswick. It is located near Riverview, Moncton, and Dieppe.

History

Education
 Lower Coverdale Elementary School (K - 5)
 Riverview Middle School (buses carry students to Riverview)
 Riverview High School (buses carry students to Riverview)

Notable people

See also
List of communities in New Brunswick
Greater Moncton

Bordering communities

References

Settlements in New Brunswick
Communities in Greater Moncton
Communities in Albert County, New Brunswick